The 4th Session of the 11th National People's Congress held its annual meeting in March 2011 at the Great Hall of the People in Beijing, China. The event opened on 5 March and concluded on 14 March. The meeting was expected to approve the country's 12th Five Year Plan.

Work report 
Chinese premier Wen Jiabao delivered the central government's work report earlier in the meeting. Wen emphasised the need to maintain economic growth and challenges such as reducing the rich poor divide, reduced environmental degradation and boost domestic consumption.

The premier indicated China will reduce carbon emissions over the next five years in a response to climate change and improving environmental protection.

At the close of the session, Premier Wen stated the government will maintain a 7 percent economic growth over the next period between 2011 and 2015 The government will focus on addressing widening rural and urban disparity, investment and consumption issues, reining in property prices and curbing inflation. Wen also striking a good balance in the economy between growth, employment and inflation so the economy can track along economic prosperity and avoid recession

The premier also mentioned about the fight against corruption. The areas focused will be in construction, sale of land use rights, mineral resources exploration, stated-owed property management and government procurement. The government will established a system for officials to regularly declare their income, investment, property and resident status of their family members.

Procurator-General's report 
Procurator-General Cao Jianming reported 2,723 corrupt officials were investigated in 2010. These officials were at the county levels and higher. The prosecutors charged 1,282 fugitives with work-related crimes in 2010. It also recovered money and goods to the value of 7.4 billion yuan.

References

External links
NPC Official Website

National Peoples Congress, 2011
National People's Congresses